Penshurst railway station is on the Redhill to Tonbridge Line and is located approximately two miles north of Penshurst in Kent, in the village of Chiddingstone Causeway in England. It is  measured from  via .

History
Penshurst station was opened by the South Eastern Railway on 26 May 1842. Penshurst Airfield, which was in operation from 1916 to 1936, and again from 1940 to 1946 as RAF Penshurst, was within ¼ mile (400 m) of the station.

In 1967 the station became unstaffed following which the original station buildings were demolished. Prior to electrification a new down platform was constructed opposite the up platform. New signalling was installed when the signal box was closed.

In 2007, a PERTIS (Permit to Travel) machine was installed at the street entrance to the Tonbridge-bound platform (since replaced by a modern ticket machine). The station was until December 2008 operated by Southeastern before it transferred to Southern, whose green signage was installed before October 2008.

Facilities and Connections
Penshurst station is unstaffed and facilities are limited. Tickets can be purchased from the self-service ticket machine at the station and there are passenger help points located on each platforms. There is also a basic shelter located on each platform. The station has step free access available to both platforms.

The station is served Monday-Saturday by the Metrobus routes 231 & 233 buses which provide connections to Edenbridge and Tunbridge Wells as well as the Autocar route 210 which provides connections to Tonbridge.

Accidents and incidents
On 28 July 1845, a light engine was in a rear-end collision with a passenger train near Penshurst. Thirty people were injured.
The driver was killed.

Services
All services at Penshurst are operated by Southern using Class 377 EMUs. 

The typical off-peak service in trains per hour is:
 1 tph to 
 1 tph to 

Services increase to 2 tph in each direction during the peak hours.

References

External links

Buildings and structures in Sevenoaks District
Railway stations in Kent
DfT Category F1 stations
Former South Eastern Railway (UK) stations
Railway stations in Great Britain opened in 1842
Railway stations served by Govia Thameslink Railway